On August 31, 1940, Pennsylvania Central Airlines Trip 19, a new Douglas DC-3A, was flying from Washington, D.C. to Detroit with a stopover in Pittsburgh. Numerous witnesses reported seeing a large flash of lightning shortly before it nosed over and plunged to earth in an alfalfa field. With limited accident investigation tools at the time, it was at first believed that the most likely cause was the plane flying into windshear, but the Civil Aeronautics Board report concluded that the probable cause was a lightning strike. U.S. Senator Ernest Lundeen was among the 21 passengers and 4 crew members killed.
Also on board were "a Special Agent of the FBI, a second FBI employee, and a prosecutor from the Criminal Division of the U.S. Department of Justice." At the time of the crash, the FBI was investigating Sen. Lundeen's ties to George Sylvester Viereck, a top Nazi spy working in the US to spread pro-Hitler and anti-Semitic propaganda.

The crash occurred during a severe rainstorm, and recovery efforts were hindered by impassable flooded roads and poor communications: the crash cut the only telephone lines in the area. Wreckage was scattered over a broad area, and it is believed that all aircraft occupants died instantly on impact. At the time, the crash was the deadliest disaster in the history of U.S. commercial aviation.

"Trip 19", as it was designated, was under the command of Captain Lowell V. Scroggins with First Officer J. Paul Moore. The pilot and copilot had over eleven thousand and six thousand hours experience respectively, although only a few hundred of those hours were on DC-3s. The aircraft was carrying 21 revenue passengers, a single flight attendant, and a deadheading airline manager riding in the jump seat in the cockpit.

The DC-3A was newly delivered from Douglas Aircraft on May 25, 1940, equipped with twin Curtiss-Wright R-1820 Cyclone 9 engines (also designated as G-102-A).

The CAB investigation of the accident was the first major investigation to be conducted under the Bureau of Air Commerce act of 1938.

References

External links
 Accident report - Civil Aeronautics Board (PDF)

Airliner accidents and incidents caused by weather
Airliner accidents and incidents in Virginia
Aviation accidents and incidents in the United States in 1940
Accidents and incidents involving the Douglas DC-3
Loudoun County, Virginia
1940 in Virginia
Capital Airlines (United States) accidents and incidents
1940 meteorology
August 1940 events